Bradyrhizobium huanghuaihaiense is a bacterium from the genus of Bradyrhizobium.

References

External links
Type strain of Bradyrhizobium huanghuaihaiense at BacDive -  the Bacterial Diversity Metadatabase

Nitrobacteraceae
Bacteria described in 2012